Vladimir Alekseyevich Gulyamkhaydarov (born 26 February 1946) is Tajikistani football coach.

Managing career
In 1994, Gulyamkhaydarov was appointed as the Head Coach of Tajikistan.

In 1996, Gulyamkhaydarov was appointed as the Manager of FC Ekibastuzets in the Kazakhstan Premier League. Gulyamkhaydarov coached FC Kairat between 1999 and 2003, where he was also the Manager for a short period in 2003. After leaving Kairat, Gulyamkhaydarov became the coach of FC Taraz for the remainder of the 2003 season. Gulyamkhaydarov coached Kairat between 2004 and 2005, and then FC Zhetysu in 2006. In June 2008, Gulyamkhaydarov was appointed as manager of newly promoted Kazakhstan Premier League side FC Megasport. In 2009 Gulyamkhaydarov coached FC Astana before becoming a coach and consultant to FC Sunkar in 2012.

References

External links

Living people
1946 births
Sportspeople from Dushanbe
Tajikistani football managers
Tajikistan national football team managers
Merited Coaches of the Soviet Union
Merited Coaches of Tajikistan
FC Taraz managers
Tajikistani footballers
Soviet footballers
Soviet Top League players
Association football midfielders
CSKA Pamir Dushanbe players
FC Torpedo Moscow players
Vakhsh Qurghonteppa players
CSKA Pamir Dushanbe managers
Soviet football managers
Tajikistani expatriate football managers
Expatriate football managers in Kazakhstan
Tajikistani expatriate sportspeople in Kazakhstan